The events of 1990 in anime.

Accolades 
Animation Film Award: Hashire! Shiroi Ōkami

Releases

See also
1990 in animation

References

External links 
Japanese animated works of the year, listed in the IMDb

Anime
Anime
Years in anime